Elisabeth Jeggle (born 21 July 1947) is a German politician who served as a Member of the European Parliament for Baden-Württemberg from 1999 until 2014. She is a member of the conservative Christian Democratic Union, part of the European People's Party.

References

1947 births
Living people
Christian Democratic Union of Germany MEPs
MEPs for Germany 1999–2004
MEPs for Germany 2004–2009
MEPs for Germany 2009–2014
20th-century women MEPs for Germany
21st-century women MEPs for Germany
Recipients of the Cross of the Order of Merit of the Federal Republic of Germany
Recipients of the Order of Merit of Baden-Württemberg